Canadian is a town in Pittsburg County, Oklahoma, United States. The population was 239 at the 2000 census.

History 
At the time of its founding, Canadian was located in Tobucksy County, Choctaw Nation, in the Indian Territory.  The settlement was originally called South Canadian, taking its name from the nearby South Fork of the Canadian River, now called Gaines Creek.  A post office was established at South Canadian, Indian Territory on May 29, 1873.  The name was changed to Canadian on December 11, 1899.

During the Civil War, the nearby Canadian Depot was an important supply depot.

Geography
Canadian is located at  (35.175033, -95.654947).

Demographics

As of the census of 2000, there were 239 people, 99 households, and 62 families residing in the town. The racial makeup of the town was 79.50% White, 12.55% Native American, and 7.95% from two or more races.

There were 99 households, out of which 28.3% had children under the age of 18 living with them, 47.5% were married couples living together, 11.1% had a female householder with no husband present, and 36.4% were non-families. 30.3% of all households were made up of individuals, and 20.2% had someone living alone who was 65 years of age or older. The average household size was 2.41 and the average family size was 2.98.

In the town, the population was spread out, with 26.4% under the age of 18, 7.9% from 18 to 24, 19.2% from 25 to 44, 30.5% from 45 to 64, and 15.9% who were 65 years of age or older. The median age was 42 years. For every 100 females, there were 94.3 males. For every 100 females age 18 and over, there were 83.3 males.

The median income for a household in the town was $18,281, and the median income for a family was $31,250. Males had a median income of $21,750 versus $27,188 for females. The per capita income for the town was $13,824. About 20.0% of families and 27.4% of the population were below the poverty line, including 34.0% of those under the age of eighteen and 20.0% of those 65 or over.

Notable people
Holly Holland, an eight-year-old girl who won a writing contest for the children's television series Arthur and had her concept air in the show's 1999 episode "The Contest".

Charles F. Carey, Jr., United States Medal of Honor recipient and Army Technical Sergeant, was born in Canadian. Carey, Jr. was an Army Infantryman during World War II who earned the posthumous Medal of Honor for commanding his outnumbered antitank battalion into positions of tactical survival, in 1945.

References

External links
 Encyclopedia of Oklahoma History and Culture - Canadian

Towns in Pittsburg County, Oklahoma
Towns in Oklahoma